Playback is a box set compilation by Tom Petty and the Heartbreakers, released in 1995.  It contains popular album tracks, B-sides, previously unreleased outtakes, and early songs by Petty's previous band Mudcrutch.

The first three discs of this collection are Petty's singles with and without the Heartbreakers, arranged in rough chronological order.  Disc One covers the years 1976-81, Disc Two covers 1982-87 and Disc Three covers 1989-93.

Disc four brings together 15 B-sides that were never officially released on Tom Petty or Heartbreakers albums. Some of these seem like throwaways, while others are miscellaneous live tracks usually found on singles' flipsides.

Discs five and six offer 27 recordings that include tracks previously unreleased or unavailable on CD, dating back to Petty's early days with his pre-Heartbreakers band Mudcrutch.

A companion VHS home video, later released on DVD, featured the band's most popular music videos.

Track listing

Disc one: The Big Jangle
"Breakdown" (Tom Petty) – 2:42
"American Girl" (Petty) – 3:33
"Hometown Blues" (Petty) – 2:12
"Anything That's Rock 'n' Roll" (Petty) – 2:24
"I Need to Know" (Petty) – 2:24
"Listen to Her Heart" (Petty) – 3:03
"When the Time Comes" (Petty) – 2:45
"Too Much Ain't Enough" (Petty) – 2:57
"No Second Thoughts" (Petty) – 2:39
"Baby's a Rock 'n' Roller" (Petty, Mike Campbell) – 2:52
"Refugee" (Petty, Campbell) – 3:22
"Here Comes My Girl" (Petty, Campbell) – 4:25
"Even the Losers" (Petty) – 3:59
"Shadow of a Doubt (A Complex Kid)" (Petty) – 4:25
"Don't Do Me Like That" (Petty) – 2:42
"The Waiting" (Petty) – 3:59
"A Woman in Love (It's Not Me)" (Petty, Campbell) – 4:23
"Something Big" (Petty) – 4:44
"A Thing About You" (Petty) – 3:32
"Insider" (Petty) – 4:23
"You Can Still Change Your Mind" (Petty, Campbell) – 4:16

Disc two: Spoiled & Mistreated
"You Got Lucky" (Petty, Campbell) – 3:36
"Change of Heart" (Petty) – 3:19
"Straight into Darkness" (Petty) – 3:47
"Same Old You" (Petty, Campbell) – 3:30
"Rebels" (Petty) – 5:19
"Don't Come Around Here No More" (Petty, Dave Stewart) – 5:05
"Southern Accents" (Petty) – 4:44
"Make It Better (Forget About Me)" (Petty, Stewart) – 4:23
"The Best of Everything" (Petty) – 4:03
"So You Want to Be a Rock 'n' Roll Star" (live) (Roger McGuinn, Chris Hillman) – 3:30
"Don't Bring Me Down" (live) (Gerry Goffin, Carole King) – 3:52
"Jammin' Me" (Petty, Campbell, Bob Dylan) – 4:08
"It'll All Work Out" (Petty) – 3:11
"Mike's Life/Mike's World" (Campbell) – 0:40
"Think About Me" (Petty) – 3:45
"A Self-Made Man" (Petty) – 3:00

Disc three: Good Booty
"Free Fallin'" (Petty, Jeff Lynne) – 4:16
"I Won't Back Down" (Petty, Lynne) – 2:57
"Love is a Long Road" (Petty, Campbell) – 4:08
"Runnin' Down a Dream" (Petty, Lynne, Campbell) – 4:23
"Yer So Bad" (Petty, Lynne) – 3:06
"Alright for Now" (Petty) – 2:02
"Learning to Fly" (Petty, Lynne) – 4:03
"Into the Great Wide Open" (Petty, Lynne) – 3:43
"All or Nothin'" (Petty, Lynne, Campbell) – 4:07
"Out in the Cold" (Petty, Lynne) – 3:40
"Built to Last" (Petty, Lynne) – 3:58
"Mary Jane's Last Dance" (Petty) – 4:33
"Christmas All Over Again" (Petty) – 4:15

Disc four: The Other Sides
"Casa Dega" (B-side of "Don't Do Me Like That," issued November 1979) [Petty / Campbell] – 3:37
"Heartbreakers Beach Party" (B-side of "Change of Heart," February 1983) [Petty] – 1:57
"Trailer" (B-side of "Don't Come Around Here No More," March 1985) [Petty] – 3:15
"Cracking Up" (B-side of "Make It Better (Forget About Me)," May 1985) (Nick Lowe) – 3:34
"Psychotic Reaction" (Count Five garage rock cover live at Lawlor Events Center, Reno, NV, November 23, 1991; from the UK-only "Too Good to Be True" 1992 maxi CD single) (Ken Ellner / Roy Chaney / Craig Atkinson / John Byrne / John Michalski) – 4:49
"I'm Tired Joey Boy" (live at Lawlor Events Center, Reno, NV, November 23, 1991; from the UK-only "Too Good to Be True" maxi CD single) (Van Morrison) – 3:42
"Lonely Weekends" (live at Oakland Coliseum, Oakland, CA, November 24, 1991; from the UK-only "Too Good to Be True" maxi CD single) (Charlie Rich) – 2:47
"Gator on the Lawn" (B-side of "A Woman in Love (It's Not Me)," July 1981) [Petty] – 1:35
"Make That Connection" (B-side of "Jammin' Me," April 18, 1987) [Petty / Campbell] – 5:04
"Down the Line" (B-side of "Free Fallin'", October 1989) [Petty / Lynne / Campbell] – 2:53
"Peace in L.A." (Peace Mix) (B-side of "Peace in L.A.," May 26, 1992) [Petty] – 4:43
"It's Rainin' Again" (B-side of "Refugee," January 1980) [Petty] – 1:32
"Somethin' Else" (live at Hammersmith Odeon, London, England, March 7, 1980; B-side of "Even the Losers" in Australia) (Sharon Sheeley / Eddie Cochran) – 2:05
"I Don't Know What to Say to You" (B-side of "Listen to Her Heart," August 30, 1978) [Petty] – 2:28
"King's Highway" (live at Stephen J O'Connell Center, University Of Florida, Gainesville, FL, November 4, 1993; B-side of the German-only "Something in the Air" as well as the UK-exclusive "Mary Jane's Last Dance" maxi CD single, March 1994) [Petty] – 3:30

Disc five: Through the Cracks
"On the Street" (1973 Mudcrutch outtake) (Benmont Tench) – 2:10
"Depot Street" (1974 Mudcrutch outtake) [Petty] – 3:26
"Cry to Me" (1974 Solomon Burke cover by Mudcrutch) [Bert Russell] – 3:06
"Don't Do Me Like That" (1974 Mudcrutch version) [Petty] – 2:47
"I Can't Fight It" (1974 Mudcrutch outtake) [Petty] – 3:00
"Since You Said You Loved Me" (1974 outtake featuring Al Kooper, Jim Gordon, and Emory Gordy) [Petty] – 4:40
"Louisiana Rain" (original 1975 version featuring Al Kooper, Jim Gordon, and Emory Gordy) [Petty] – 4:22
"Keeping Me Alive" (from 1982 "Long After Dark" sessions) [Petty] – 2:59
"Turning Point" (from 1982 "Long After Dark" sessions) [Petty] – 2:52
"Stop Draggin' My Heart Around" (demo from "Hard Promises" 1981 sessions) [Petty, Campbell] – 4:11
"The Apartment Song" (demo from "Southern Accents" 1984 sessions) [Petty] – 2:37
"Big Boss Man" ("Southern Accents" 1984 sessions) [Al Smith, Luther Dixon] – 2:41
"The Image of Me" (Conway Twitty cover; "Southern Accents" 1984 sessions) [Wayne Kemp] – 2:33
"Moon Pie" ("Let Me Up [I've Had Enough]" 1986 sessions) [Petty] – 1:05
"The Damage You've Done" (country version from "Let Me Up [I've Had Enough]" 1986 sessions) [Petty] – 3:16

Disc six: Nobody's Children
"Got My Mind Made Up" (from 1986 "Let Me Up (I've Had Enough)" sessions; Bob Dylan added different lyrics for his "Knocked Out Loaded" version) [Petty] – 2:51
"Ways to Be Wicked" (from 1986 "Let Me Up (I've Had Enough)" sessions) [Petty, Campbell] – 3:27
"Can't Get Her Out" (from 1986 "Let Me Up (I've Had Enough)" sessions) [Petty] – 3:11
"Waiting for Tonight" (from 1988 sessions featuring The Bangles on backing vocals) [Petty] – 3:30
"Travelin'" (1988 outtake from an aborted Heartbreakers album) [Petty] – 3:15
"Baby, Let's Play House" (Elvis Presley cover from July 1993 "Mary Jane's Last Dance" sessions") (Arthur Gunter) – 2:33
"Wooden Heart" (Elvis Presley cover from July 1993 "Mary Jane's Last Dance" sessions) (Bert Kaempfert, Kay Twomey, Fred Wise, Ben Weisman) – 2:09
"God's Gift to Man" (August 1992 outtake from an aborted Heartbreakers follow-up to "Into the Great Wide Open") [Petty] – 4:18
"You Get Me High" (August 1992 outtake from an aborted Heartbreakers follow-up to "Into the Great Wide Open") [Petty] – 2:48
"Come on Down to My House" (from July 1993 "Mary Jane's Last Dance" sessions) [Petty] – 3:05
"You Come Through" (demo from 1986 "Let Me Up (I've Had Enough)" sessions featuring Lenny Kravitz overdubs recorded in August 1995) [Petty / Campbell] – 5:15
"Up in Mississippi Tonight" (Debut 1973 A-side for Mudcrutch) [Petty] – 3:28

Notes
In 2015, both Through the Cracks and Nobody's Children were released on digital purchasing and streaming platforms as standalone releases. As of 2020, only Nobody's Children is still available to digitally purchase and stream.

Personnel
Tom Petty and the Heartbreakers

Ron Blair (most tracks 1976-81, plus "The Best of Everything") – bass guitar, acoustic guitar ("Baby's a Rock 'n' Roller"), backing vocals ("Heartbreakers Beach Party" and "It's Rainin' Again")
Mike Campbell (all tracks) – lead guitar, rhythm guitar, bass guitar, squeeze box, mandolin, backing vocals ("Heartbreakers Beach Party", "It's Rainin' Again" and "Learning To Fly"), Dobro ("Southern Accents"), koto ("It'll All Work Out"), percussion ("Mike's Life/Mike's World"), keyboards ("All or Nothin'")
Howie Epstein (most tracks 1982-93) – bass guitar, backing vocals, acoustic lead guitar ("Big Boss Man"), spoken word vocal (via telephone) ("Peace in L.A.")
Steve Ferrone – drum overdub ("Ways to Be Wicked")
Stan Lynch (most tracks) – drums, percussion, backing vocals, lead vocal ("Psychotic Reaction")
Tom Petty (all tracks, except disc 2 track 14) – lead vocals, backing vocals, spoken word vocals, whistling, rhythm guitar, lead guitar ("Mary Jane's Last Dance" and "Peace in L.A."), bass guitar, piano, electric piano, harmonica, percussion
Benmont Tench (most tracks) – piano, electric piano, keyboards, backing vocals, crash cymbal ("It's Rainin' Again")
Scott Thurston – six-string bass guitar (disc 3 track 13), guitar (disc 4 tracks 5, 7 and 15), slide guitar (disc 4 track 6)

Additional musicians

Phil Jones – percussion (disc 1 tracks 16-21, disc 2 tracks 1-4 and 8, disc 3 tracks 1-2, 4-5 and 13, disc 4 tracks 2 and 8 and disc 5 tracks 8 and 10), drums (disc 3 tracks 1-2 and 4-5, disc 4 track 10), backing vocal (disc 4 track 2)
Jeff Lynne – bass guitar (disc 3 tracks 1-4, 7-8, 10-11, and 13 and disc 4 track 10), guitar (disc 3 tracks 1-2, 4-5, 7-8, and 10-11), keyboards (disc 3 tracks 1-3, 7-8, and 11), backing vocals (disc 3 tracks 1-3, 5, 7-11 and 13 and disc 4 track 10), piano (disc 3 tracks 2 and 5), guitar synthesizer (disc 3 track 4), electric piano (disc 3 track 7), percussion (disc 3 track 13)
George Drakoulias – percussion (disc 5 tracks 8-9 and disc 6 tracks 1-5, 9 and 11), drums (disc 5 track 11)
Phil Seymour – backing vocals on "Breakdown" and "American Girl"
Donald "Duck" Dunn – bass guitar on "Hometown Blues", "A Woman in Love (It's Not Me)" and "Stop Draggin' My Heart Around"
Jim Keltner – percussion on "Refugee", "The Best of Everything" and "Love is a Long Road", drums on "Love Is a Long Road" and "Christmas All Over Again"
Stevie Nicks – backing vocals on "Insider", "You Can Still Change Your Mind" and "The Apartment Song" (demo)
Molly Duncan – saxophone on "Rebels" and "Make it Better (Forget About Me)"
Bobbye Hall – tambourine on "Rebels"
Dean Garcia – intro bass guitar on "Don't Come Around Here No More"
Marilyn Martin – backing vocal on "Don't Come Around Here No More"
Dave Stewart – electric sitar, synthesizer and backing vocal on "Don't Come Around Here No More", guitar on "Make it Better (Forget About Me)"
Jack Nitzsche – string arrangement on "Southern Accents"
Gary Chang – synthesizer on "The Best of Everything"
Garth Hudson – organ on "The Best of Everything"
Richard Manuel – backing vocal on "The Best of Everything"
Jerry Hey – horn arrangement on "The Best of Everything"
George Harrison – acoustic guitar and backing vocal on "I Won't Back Down"
Robbie Blunt, Kevin Dukes, and Jimmy Rip – acoustic guitars on "Christmas All Over Again"
Tim Pierce – electric guitar on "Christmas All Over Again"
Scott Humphrey – synthesizer on "Christmas All Over Again"
Mitchell Froom – harpsichord on "Christmas All Over Again"
Shelly Yakus – backing vocals on "Heartbreakers Beach Party" and "It's Rainin' Again"
Jimmy Iovine – backing vocals on "Heartbreakers Beach Party" and "It's Rainin' Again", telephone ring (sound effect) on "Cracking Up"
Carlene Carter – spoken word vocal (via telephone) on "Peace in L.A."
John Sebastian – baritone guitar on "I Don't Know What to Say to You"
Charlie Souza – bass guitar on "Don't Do Me Like That" (Mudcrutch version)
Al Kooper – organ and piano on "Since You Said You Loved Me" and "Louisiana Rain"
Emory Gordy – bass guitar on "Since You Said You Loved Me" and "Louisiana Rain"
Jim Gordon – drums on "Since You Said You Loved Me" and "Louisiana Rain"
Susanna Hoffs, Debbi Peterson, Vicki Peterson and Michael Steele – backing vocals on "Waiting for Tonight"
Lenny Kravitz – drums, bass guitar, backing vocal and spoken word vocal on "You Come Through"
Tom Leadon – lead guitar and backing vocal on "Up in Mississippi Tonight"

VHS/DVD
"Here Comes My Girl" (1979)
"Refugee" (1979)
"The Waiting" (1981)
"A Woman in Love (It's Not Me)" (1981)
"Insider" (1981)
"You Got Lucky" (1982)
"Change of Heart" (1982)
"Don't Come Around Here No More" (1985)
"Jammin' Me" (1987)
"I Won't Back Down" (1989)
"Runnin' Down A Dream" (1989)
"Free Fallin'" (1989)
"A Face in the Crowd" (1990)
"Yer So Bad" (1990)
"Learning to Fly" (1991)
"Into the Great Wide Open" (1991)
"Mary Jane's Last Dance" (1993)

Certifications

References

Tom Petty compilation albums
Albums produced by Denny Cordell
Albums produced by Jeff Lynne
Albums produced by Tom Petty
B-side compilation albums
1995 compilation albums